A number of steamships have been named Orkla, including:

, Norwegian ship in service 1908–39
, Norwegian cargo ship in service 1953–57

Ship names